The coat of arms of Eswatini is a coat of arms depicting various symbols for traditional Eswatini culture. The lion represents the King of Eswatini and the elephant represents the Queen-mother. They support a traditional Nguni shield which represents "protection". Above the shield is the King's lidlabe, or crown of feathers, normally worn during Incwala (the festival of the harvest). On a banner below the shield is Eswatini's national motto, Siyinqaba, meaning, "We are the fortress".

References

Eswatini
National symbols of Eswatini
Eswatini
Eswatini
Eswatini
Eswatini